Ballon is a former commune in the Sarthe department in the region of Pays de la Loire in north-western France. On 1 January 2016, it was merged into the new commune of Ballon-Saint-Mars.

See also
Communes of the Sarthe department
Château de Ballon

References

External links

Former communes of Sarthe